Yevgeny Feofanov (29 April 1937 – 29 March 2000) was a boxer from the Soviet Union. He was born in Moscow, Russia. He competed for the Soviet Union in the 1960 Summer Olympics held in Rome, Italy in the middleweight event where he finished in third place.

References
Yevgeny Feofanov's profile at Sports Reference.com
Yevgeny Feofanov's profile at Sports-Strana.ru 

1937 births
2000 deaths
Soviet male boxers
Olympic boxers of the Soviet Union
Olympic bronze medalists for the Soviet Union
Boxers at the 1960 Summer Olympics
Olympic medalists in boxing
Martial artists from Moscow
Russian male boxers
Medalists at the 1960 Summer Olympics
Middleweight boxers